Roland Lipcsei (born 19 January 1984 in Szarvas) is a Hungarian football (midfielder) player who currently plays for Budaörsi SC.

References 
HLSZ 

1984 births
Living people
People from Szarvas
Hungarian footballers
Association football midfielders
BFC Siófok players
MTK Budapest FC players
Jászberényi SE footballers
Rákospalotai EAC footballers
Budaörsi SC footballers
Sportspeople from Békés County